Bresee Hall is a historic institutional building located on the campus of Hartwick College at Oneonta in Otsego County, New York. It was designed by architect John Russell Pope and built in 1928.  It is a rectangular, three story brick building with a symmetrical thirteen bay facade.  The east facade features a projecting, pedimented three bay pavilion.  The formal entrance is located at the center of the pavilion and consists of a portico composed of flanking pilasters and columns with composite capitals, a broad entablature and a segmental pediment.  The building is topped by a hipped roof with a two-stage octagonal wooden cupola topped by a weather vane.  The building has Colonial Revival style detailing.

It was listed on the National Register of Historic Places in 2004.

References

School buildings on the National Register of Historic Places in New York (state)
Colonial Revival architecture in New York (state)
School buildings completed in 1928
John Russell Pope buildings
Buildings and structures in Otsego County, New York
National Register of Historic Places in Otsego County, New York
1928 establishments in New York (state)